Events from the year 1877 in Bolivia.

Incumbents
President: Hilarión Daza

Events
May 9 - 1877 Iquique earthquake

Births

Deaths

 
1870s in Bolivia